The  was a Japanese general army responsible for the defense of the country against Allied air raids during the last months of World War II. The Air General Army was formed in April 1945 to better coordinate Japan's air defenses in response to the mounting air offensive against Japan and the expected invasion of the country later that year. The army was disbanded following the end of the war.

See also
Armies of the Imperial Japanese Army

References

Notes

Bibliography
 
 
 
 

Military units and formations established in 1945
Military units and formations disestablished in 1945
Units and formations of the Imperial Japanese Army Air Service
Army groups of Japan